Alexander McDonald (6 February 1849 – 10 April 1922) was an Australian politician who represented the South Australian House of Assembly multi-member seats of Noarlunga from 1887 to 1902 and Alexandra from 1902 to 1915. He represented the Australasian National League from 1893 to 1910 and the Liberal Union from 1910 until 1915.

References

1849 births
1922 deaths
Members of the South Australian House of Assembly